Joseph Cilia (22 October 1937 – 5 August 2017) was a Maltese professional football player and manager.

Career
Joe Cilia's natural talent and passion as a footballer was evident from when he first kicked a ball. He quickly climbed the ranks and by the time he was nineteen, in 1957 he made his debut for the Malta national football team. and he was the youngest player in the now legendary team which played Malta's first international against mighty Austria. He became an automatic choice for the Malta XI, and Malta captain from 1959 to 1964. He was always captain for all the other teams he played with and is now considered to be one of the greatest centre-halves Malta has ever witnessed. His consistency, courage, composure and cunning made him much loved by his supporters, and respected by the opposition.
With Valletta F.C., he won all the titles on offer, to end a period dominated by Sliema and Floriana. He played blinders against foreign teams, including Manchester United (0-1), helping Malta XI gain very good results.
He was the very first player to win the coveted Footballer of the Year twice. He also held records including playing 49 competitive games in one season and another for playing every game except one, for nine consecutive seasons between 1955 and 1964.
Between 1964 and 1971 he emigrated to Australia where he played for Corinthians and Melita FC, with whom he won the Footballer of the Year again. On returning to Malta, he played another two seasons with Valletta F.C., and played against Internazionale FC. He exchanged shirts with the famous Boninsegna. He finally hung up his boots in 1976.
Having performed the role of player-coach since 1961, he could now dedicate more time exclusively to coaching. He coached most of the top-flight teams at the time, where he won the League Championship first with Valletta F.C., 1983 until 1985 and then all the honours available with his first love Rabat Ajax F.C., for two consecutive and historic seasons. In 1989-1992 he worked with Hibernians F.C. He also coached the Malta U/21 gaining two wins out of three games. His only regret was that he was never given the opportunity to coach the Malta Senior National Team.
He won the Westin Malta Football Award in 2003, and "Gieh ir-Rabat" in 2004, in appreciation of his 50 years of continuous contribution to his only passion, which is football.
Cilia died on 5 August 2017, aged 79.

References

External links

Profile at Soccerpunter.com

1937 births
2017 deaths
Maltese footballers
Malta international footballers
Association football defenders
Rabat Ajax F.C. players
Valletta F.C. players
Maltese football managers
Valletta F.C. managers
Rabat Ajax F.C. managers
Hibernians F.C. managers
Place of birth missing